The Dayton House is a historic home located at 243 Dearborn Street, in the Black Rock neighborhood of Buffalo, Erie County, New York.

It was the home of Lewis P. Dayton (1821–1900), noted physician and Mayor of the City of Buffalo, New York, serving 1874–1875. The house has been dated to about 1840 in the Georgian style. It received an Italianate update in the 1870s and is an excellent example of canal era prosperity.  It is the only remaining brick residence of its style in Black Rock.

In 2011 the building was listed on the National Register of Historic Places.

See also
National Register of Historic Places listings in Buffalo, New York

References

Houses completed in 1840
Houses on the National Register of Historic Places in New York (state)
Georgian architecture in New York (state)
Italianate architecture in New York (state)
Houses in Erie County, New York
National Register of Historic Places in Buffalo, New York